Leen Nupa, also spelled Len Nupa, is a valley in Tedim, Chin state, Myanmar. It is also known as Buan Nel.

Culture 
The valley has a rich culture and nearly sacred meaning to the locals. The ancient Zomi believed that their souls met on this mountain after death. Ancient local cultures prayed over animals there. Leen Nupa is one of the most famous mountains in the Zomi culture, hosting a rich history.

Demographics 
The Zomi people or Zomi (meaning highlanders), also known as the Mizo, the Kuki, the Chin and a number of other names, are a large group of Tibeto-Burman related peoples. This population spreads throughout the northeastern states of India, northwestern Myanmar and the Chittagong Hill Tracts of Bangladesh. In northeastern India, they are present in Nagaland, Mizoram, Manipur and Assam. Their distribution is the result of British colonial territory policy, focusing on drawing borders on political grounds rather than ethnic ones. 

The Zomi people have typical Tibeto-Burman features and are generally of short stature with straight, black hair and dark, brown eyes. Natively, the Zo speak one of some fifty languages that linguists call the Kuki-Chin language group.

See also
List of mountains in Burma

References

 Mountains of Myanmar
 Chin State